"Ora Tōkyō sa Iguda" (俺ら東京さ行ぐだ Ora Tōkyō sa iguda, "I'm going to Tokyo") is a song written and sung by the Japanese singer Yoshi Ikuzō, and was sung in his native Tsugaru dialect. It was released on November 25, 1984. In the song, the singer declares that he will leave his small hometown in the countryside to move to Tokyo.

Reception

The song was received positively, reaching 21st place on the Oricon Albums Chart in 1985 and 4th in the weekly chart. The song was criticized by some who lived in rural areas saying that things were not as underdeveloped as described in the song, but Yoshi Ikuzō stated that the lyrics "we don't have a TV, radio, telephone, gas, or electricity" described what life was like in his hometown of Kanagi (present day Goshogawara) when he was young.

Movie 
The song served as the basis for a comedy film by the same name in 1985 produced and distributed by Shochiku. The plot of the movie involves a fight between a son who lives and works in Tokyo as a photographer's assistant and his parents. Yoshi Ikuzō made a cameo appearance as a taxi driver.

References 

1984 songs
1984 singles
Japanese-language songs